Bolat Kabdylkhamituly Nurgaliyev (Bolat Qabdylhamitūly Nūrğaliev; born July 25, 1951) is a Kazakh diplomat and the current Special Representative of the OSCE Chairperson-in-Office for protracted conflicts.

Nurgaliyev studied foreign languages at the Tselinograd State Pedagogical Institute. He joined the Soviet Foreign Ministry, and served from 1980 to 1992 throughout South Asia. He then was the director of the Department of International Security and Arms Control Department of the Kazakh Foreign Ministry for four years, until he was appointed Ambassador to the United States in 1996. In 2001, he became Kazakhstan's ambassador to South Korea, and in 2003 the ambassador to Japan. He served as Secretary-General of the Shanghai Cooperation Organisation from January 1, 2007 to December 31, 2009. Shortly after taking office, Nurgaliyev commented that "The most important task for the SCO now is to further crackdown on terrorism, separatism and extremism". He was appointed as the Special Representative of the OSCE Chairperson-in-Office for protracted conflicts for the 2010 Kazakhstani Chairmanship of the OSCE.

References

1951 births
Ambassadors of Kazakhstan to South Korea
Ambassadors of Kazakhstan to the United States
Ambassadors of Kazakhstan to Japan
Ambassadors of Kazakhstan to Canada
Ambassadors of Kazakhstan to Mexico
Ambassadors of Kazakhstan to Israel
Living people